DNR may refer to:

Medicine
 Do not resuscitate, a medical instruction

Media and entertainment

Music
 DNR (music), a UK songwriting and production duo
 Dreams Not Reality, an Italian glam rock band
 A song on The Gathering (Testament album)

Television
 An episode of House, a medical drama
 An episode of Becker, a situation comedy

Other media
 Daily News Record, a fashion periodical

Organisations
 Department of Natural Resources (disambiguation), various government bodies in Australia, Canada and the United States

Places
 Donetsk People's Republic, former quasi-state in Ukraine (2014-2022)
 Donetsk People's Republic, a de facto federal subject of Russia
 Dinard–Pleurtuit–Saint-Malo Airport, in France, IATA code

Technology
 Dialed number recorder, a telephone surveillance device
 Dynamic Noise Reduction, in telephony